Paul Gallez (1920–2007) was an Argentinian cartographer and historian, born in Brussels, and based on the city of Bahía Blanca, province of Buenos Aires, Argentina.

He made an extensive research on maps to show that America was known long before the Age of Discovery, inspired by previous works by Dick Edgar Ibarra Grasso and Enrique de Gandía.

He was the first to identify all the principal fluvial system of South America in the Henricus Martellus Germanus map of 1489, using a distortion grid.

He considers that fellow historians and himself constitutes the so-called Argentine School of Protocartography.

Publications 

 1990 La Cola del Dragón. América del Sur en los mapas antiguos, medievales y renacentistas. 185 pp., 53 ilus. in-8º. B. Blanca, Instituto Patagónico.
 1991 Cristobal de Haro. Banqueros y  pimenteros en busca del estrecho magállanico. 112 pp., 22 ilustr. in-8º. B. Blanca, Instituto Patagónico.
 1999 Protocartografia y exploraciones. 132 pp., 32 mapas, 6 illust. Bahía Blanca, Inst. Patag.
 Walsperger and His Knowledge of the Patagonian Giants, 1448. In: Imago Mundi. The international journal for the history of cartography. Thaylor & Francis, London 1981 (Jg. 33), S. 91-93
 Problems of regional planning in semi arid countries, The Annals of Regional Science Volume 4, Number 2, 36-42, 
 Les travaux de l'Ecole Argentine de Protocartographie Archives internationales d'Histoire des Sciences, Vol. XXVIII, Nº102, pp. 119–120, 1978, Wiesbaden, Germany

See also 
 Dick Edgar Ibarra Grasso
 Enrique de Gandía
 Pre-Columbian trans-oceanic contact

References

External links 
 South America on ancient, medieval and Renaissance maps

Belgian emigrants to Argentina
20th-century Argentine historians
Argentine male writers
Argentine cartographers
Argentine geographers
1920 births
2007 deaths
Scientists from Brussels
20th-century geographers
Male non-fiction writers
20th-century cartographers